SS Blanche was the first ship built by A and J Inglis at Pointhouse, Glasgow as Yard No.1 and launched on 8 April 1863. She was a cargo steamer and entered service in May 1863 with Glasgow shipowner, Hermann L Seligmann on his Glasgow-Dunkirk service. Seligmann sold Blanche in 1864 to Mathew Langlands of M Langlands & Sons, Glasgow, and in 1867 she was resold to London-based Joseph Weatherley. In 1888 the ship was purchased by Christopher Furness of West Hartlepool, who employed her as a coastal collier. Furness' shipping business was incorporated in October 1891 as Furness, Withy & Company Ltd but, before formal transfer of her ownership, Blanche was sold to Osborn & Wallis of Bristol.

Blanche was wrecked on 15 July 1901 on Île-Tudy on her passage from Cardiff to Quimper, Brittany, with a cargo of bran.

References 

1863 ships
Ships built in Glasgow
Maritime incidents in 1901
Shipwrecks in the Atlantic Ocean
Shipwrecks of France